Harold Heartt Foley (1874 – 1923) was an early twentieth-century American painter, collagist and illustrator.

Youth and education 
Born in New York City in 1874, the young Harold Leroy Livingston grew up in an honorable and wealthy family.
He was a good student of art and quickly became a success as a painter and magazine illustrator.
The influence of Howard Pyle and Arthur Rackham are obvious in many works during the period 1900–1910. He aspired to participate at The Golden Age of Illustration generation. As he was fascinated by European history and arts, he decided to move there.

Europe 
In September 1906, in Malta, he married miss Elizabeth Schell-Cragin Foley became famous as Harold Heartt for his illustration of  Selma Lagerlöf's book The Wonderful Adventures of Nils published in New York by Grosset & Dunlap in 1907. The couple settled in Paris.

He used to expose his works in the salons in Paris.

Well known in the "American colony", Harold and his wife used to welcome and help American artists living abroad like Arthur Garfield Dove.

Harold Heartt Foley died in Paris in 1923 and was buried in Montparnasse cemetery.

See also
 The Wonderful Adventures of Nils

References

External links
 HaroldHearttFoley blog at Tumblr 
 

1874 births
1923 deaths
19th-century American painters
American male painters
20th-century American painters
American watercolorists
American expatriates in France
American magazine illustrators
Burials at Montparnasse Cemetery
19th-century American male artists
20th-century American male artists